The 2015 International V8 Supercars Championship (often simplified to the 2015 V8 Supercars Championship) was an FIA-sanctioned international auto racing series for V8 Supercars. It was the seventeenth running of the V8 Supercar Championship Series and the nineteenth series in which V8 Supercars have contested the premier Australian touring car title.

Mark Winterbottom of Prodrive Racing Australia secured his first championship title with one race remaining, winning nine races during the season, while Triple Eight Race Engineering won the Teams' Championship. The Enduro Cup was won by Garth Tander and Warren Luff, driving for the Holden Racing Team.

Teams and drivers
Holden, Nissan and Volvo were all represented by factory-backed teams. Ford reduced its commitment as a prelude to a complete exit from the series at the end of the season, while Mercedes-Benz continued to be represented without any factory support.

The following drivers competed in the 2015 championship.

Team changes

Teams competing with the Ford Falcon updated to the new Falcon FG X, though Rod Nash Racing and Super Black Racing started the season with the previous FG configuration. Both teams updated to the FG X for the second event of the championship.
Ford Performance Racing was rebranded as Prodrive Racing Australia, following Ford reducing its funding to the team.
Charlie Schwerkolt Racing switched from racing a customer Ford Performance Racing Falcon to a customer Holden Racing Team Commodore.
Dick Johnson Racing was rebranded as DJR Team Penske, after Team Penske purchased a 51% stake in the team. The team scaled back to run a single car.
James Rosenberg Racing returned its Racing Entitlement Contract (REC) to the series' management.
Lucas Dumbrell Motorsport returned to fielding two cars having scaled back to run a single car in 2014.
Super Black Racing entered the series full-time as a customer of Prodrive Racing Australia with a REC leased from DJR Team Penske.

Driver changes

After making a one-off appearance at the 2014 Sydney NRMA 500 for Dick Johnson Racing, former series champion Marcos Ambrose returned to the championship on a full-time basis. With the team scaling back to run a single car for Ambrose, Scott Pye was left without a drive.
Tim Blanchard joined Lucas Dumbrell Motorsport full-time after driving for the team in the endurance races in 2014.
Andre Heimgartner competed in his first full-time season, driving for Super Black Racing, after racing in a wildcard entry in the 2014 Supercheap Auto Bathurst 1000.
Lee Holdsworth moved from Erebus Motorsport to Charlie Schwerkolt Racing, replacing Jack Perkins. Holdsworth's place at Erebus Motorsport was taken by Ashley Walsh.
Nick Percat moved from James Rosenberg Racing to Lucas Dumbrell Motorsport following Russell Ingall's retirement from full-time driving.
David Wall moved from Dick Johnson Racing to Garry Rogers Motorsport to replace Robert Dahlgren.

Mid-season changes
Marcos Ambrose stepped down from full-time driving duties at DJR Team Penske prior to the second event of the championship. He was replaced by Scott Pye, who had originally been listed as the team's endurance co-driver, for the rest of the season. Ambrose returned as a co-driver for the endurance races.
James Courtney was injured during practice for the Sydney Motorsport Park Super Sprint when he was hit by pieces of pit equipment which were flung into the air by a low-flying helicopter. His endurance co-driver, Jack Perkins, replaced him for the remainder of the weekend. Courtney also missed the Wilson Security Sandown 500 and Supercheap Auto Bathurst 1000, with Russell Ingall coming out of retirement to be co-driver for Perkins.
Cameron Waters made his full-time V8 Supercar début, replacing Chaz Mostert at Prodrive Racing Australia after Mostert was injured in an accident at the Bathurst 1000. As Waters was originally scheduled to partner Mostert for the Gold Coast 600, Russell Ingall was drafted in as co-driver ahead of James Courtney's return to the Holden Racing Team. Steve Owen drove the car at the Sydney 500 to allow Waters to concentrate on his Dunlop Series commitments.
Dean Canto replaced Ashley Walsh at the Phillip Island event, with Erebus Motorsport citing the need for an experienced driver to help with car setup. Alex Davison drove the car at the Sydney 500 as Erebus Motorsport continues its development program.
Chris Pither replaced Andre Heimgartner at the Phillip Island event as Super Black Racing evaluated its full-time driver options for 2016. Pither also drove at the Sydney 500, having been confirmed as Heimgartner's replacement for 2016.
After taking part in Friday practice at the Phillip Island event, Nick Percat elected not to take part in the rest of the weekend due to a foot injury sustained at the Gold Coast 600. He was replaced by Paul Dumbrell for the rest of the event. Percat did not recover in time for the Sydney 500 and was replaced by Jack Perkins for the event.

Season calendar
The 2015 calendar was released on 12 September 2014. Two non-championship events were held; one being the MSS Security V8 Supercars Challenge in conjunction with the Australian Grand Prix on 12–15 March, and the other a demonstration using five cars (one from each manufacturer) at the Kuala Lumpur City Grand Prix in Malaysia over 7–9 August.

Calendar changes
The Auckland event moved from April to November, while the Winton and Perth events swapped positions on the calendar.

Format changes
Each Super Sprint event featured two hours of Friday practice which incorporated testing time for the teams. The Townsville event reverted to its original 400-kilometre format, with a 200-kilometre race held on both Saturday and Sunday. The Saturday races of Super Sprint events were contested over a shorter distance of 60 kilometres per race, compared to the 100-kilometre races held in 2014. No twilight races were held. After holding a fourth race on the Friday in 2013 and 2014, the Auckland event was reduced to three races, the same as all other Super Sprint events.

Other changes
The season saw the commencement of a new television deal, with Foxtel and Network Ten taking over the broadcasting rights from Seven Network. All races are being shown live on Foxtel's Fox Sports with six events – Adelaide, Townsville, Sandown, Bathurst, the Gold Coast and Sydney – also being televised live on Ten. Ten also broadcasts limited highlights of the other events. The television series Inside Supercars and Supercars Life were also launched by Fox Sports to accompany their coverage. Ten revived their motorsport magazine series RPM to accompany their own coverage.

The number of test days allocated to each team was reduced from four to three. A compulsory two-day test was held at Sydney Motorsport Park on 7–8 February 2015, with teams allocated one further day of private testing that could be used at their discretion. The amount of track time on Fridays at eight rounds has been increased to account for the reduced number of test days.

From Darwin, in response to processional racing in the 60 km SuperSprint races, the V8 Supercar Commission changed tyre allocations to give teams a set of soft compound rubber for the second race.

Season results

Event summaries

Clipsal 500 Adelaide

Jamie Whincup began his title defence in a strong manner, taking pole position for both of the Saturday races. He went on to win the first race of the weekend ahead of Chaz Mostert and Fabian Coulthard. Scott McLaughlin, after qualifying third, failed to start the race after his car's oil pump failed on the warm-up lap. Whincup dropped down the order in the second race due to a puncture, while Coulthard took victory with James Courtney and Craig Lowndes rounding out the podium. McLaughlin jumped the start and served the resulting ten-second penalty under safety car conditions, which led to another ten seconds being added to his race time, while Mostert hit the wall at turn eight and retired from the race. Michael Caruso also hit the wall at turn eight after contact with David Reynolds led to a puncture. Will Davison, after retiring from the first race, failed to start the second after a clutch failure on the warm-up lap. Courtney won the final race of the weekend on Sunday ahead of Shane van Gisbergen and Garth Tander. Whincup and Mostert made contact on the last lap while battling for fourth, which led to Mostert hitting the wall and being collected by James Moffat. Both Mostert and Moffat failed to complete the lap. Marcos Ambrose, after struggling on Saturday, qualified inside the top ten on Sunday and finished twelfth. Courtney left the event with the championship lead ahead of Coulthard and Tander.

Tyrepower Tasmania Super Sprint

As in 2014, Triple Eight Race Engineering won all three races at the Symmons Plains event. Having qualified on pole position for both of the Saturday races, Craig Lowndes went on to comfortably win both races. Mark Winterbottom and Jamie Whincup filled the runner-up positions, while James Courtney finished third in both races. Will Davison, after taking third place at the beginning of the first race, was turned around by Courtney later on the first lap. Davison labelled Courtney as "arrogant" after the latter claimed that contact from behind pushed him into the back of Davison. Courtney was not penalised for the incident, despite Davison's team Erebus Motorsport protesting the stewards' original decision. Lowndes again took pole position for the Sunday race but made contact with David Reynolds at the first corner, causing Reynolds to spin and earning himself a drive-through penalty. This handed the lead to Whincup, who went on to win the race ahead of Chaz Mostert and Shane van Gisbergen. The result saw Whincup move into the championship lead ahead of Courtney and Lowndes.

Ubet Perth Super Sprint

Chaz Mostert took his first V8 Supercar pole position when he qualified fastest for the first race of the Ubet Perth Super Sprint. His teammate Mark Winterbottom qualified second and went on to score pole position for the second race. Winterbottom made a better start than Mostert in the first race and the pair went on to finish first and second, while Craig Lowndes finished in third. Jamie Whincup, after qualifying in 21st place, managed to finish in 15th place but lost the championship lead to Lowndes. Winterbottom won the second race ahead of Whincup and Fabian Coulthard. With Lowndes finishing fifth, Winterbottom took the championship lead. Mostert took his second pole in qualifying for the Sunday race. The session saw Lee Holdsworth make a mistake at turn six and his car rolled onto its side after digging into the sand trap. Despite starting off the front row, Mostert and Winterbottom finished fourth and 15th respectively after their tyre strategy was ruined by a safety car on lap 48. Will Davison won the race, taking Erebus Motorsport's second ever victory, after passing Lowndes for the lead with five laps remaining. Coulthard finished third despite starting 24th. With Winterbottom finishing down the order, Lowndes left the event with the championship lead.

NP300 Navara Winton Super Sprint

Prodrive Racing Australia carried their strong form into the Winton event. Chaz Mostert claimed the opening race, his first for the season, ahead of his teammate Mark Winterbottom, while Michael Caruso claimed Nissan Motorsport's first podium finish for the year. Winterbottom won the second race of the weekend, with Rick Kelly scoring another podium for Nissan Motorsport, while Mostert finished in third place after starting from pole. The Holden Racing Team endured a difficult race after James Courtney carried too much speed into the first corner and took his teammate Garth Tander out of the race. Lee Holdsworth, driving a customer Holden Racing Team car, also suffered damage in the incident. Mostert took his fourth consecutive pole position in qualifying for the third race, becoming the first driver to achieve the feat since Winterbottom in 2011. Mostert was leading at the halfway mark of the race when he dropped his left-rear wheel onto the grass on the entry to turn four, causing him to spin into the tyre wall. Winterbottom inherited the lead and went on to win the race ahead of Fabian Coulthard and Craig Lowndes. Despite finishing on the podium, Lowndes lost the championship lead to Winterbottom.

Skycity Triple Crown Darwin

Chaz Mostert won the first race of the Skycity Triple Crown ahead of teammate Mark Winterbottom. Rick Kelly took his second podium finish in three races by finishing third. James Courtney had taken pole position but tangled with Shane van Gisbergen and Garth Tander on a restart after a safety car period, with Courtney penalised for his role in the incident. Jamie Whincup, Craig Lowndes and Jason Bright also received points penalties for various incidents during the race. Lowndes recovered in the second race to score his 100th career victory in the Australian Touring Car Championship and V8 Supercars, becoming the first driver to reach the mark. Tim Slade finished second ahead of Mostert. Rick Kelly had qualified on pole position for the first time since 2011 but collided with Fabian Coulthard at the first corner and received a drive-through penalty. David Reynolds took pole position for the Sunday race but Coulthard took the lead at the start. Coulthard lost the lead when he went off the track while lapping Andre Heimgartner, losing places to Reynolds and Mostert. Reynolds himself ran off the circuit in trying to avoid the lapped Michael Caruso, cutting off a portion of the track in the process. After retaking his place behind Caruso, Reynolds held off Mostert to take victory. A delaminated tyre for Lowndes towards the end of the race dropped him to fifteenth, allowing Winterbottom to extend his championship lead to 95 points.

Castrol Edge Townsville 400

Mark Winterbottom further extended his championship lead by winning both races of the Castrol Edge Townsville 400. He qualified second for the first race behind teammate Chaz Mostert but took the lead at the start and then held off David Reynolds in the closing stages of the race. Fabian Coulthard finished third while Mostert drifted to eighth late in the race due to a rear suspension problem. Scott McLaughlin took his first pole position of the season in qualifying for the second race ahead of Mostert and Reynolds. McLaughlin lost positions to Reynolds and Mostert in the opening part of the race before retiring when his car lost a power steering belt. Winterbottom moved up to second after the final pit stop and was able to take the lead from Reynolds. The Holden Racing Team drivers James Courtney and Garth Tander showed good pace late in the race, moving up to second and fourth respectively, but were unable to catch Winterbottom. Reynolds finished third while Mostert again faded in the closing stages, finishing sixth. With Craig Lowndes and Fabian Coulthard both experiencing difficulties during the weekend, Winterbottom left the event with a championship lead of 248 points.

Coates Hire Ipswich Super Sprint

Prodrive Racing Australia continued their strong form at the Ipswich Super Sprint, winning all three races. Mark Winterbottom won both of the Saturday races, taking the lead from second place on the first lap of each race. Scott McLaughlin took his first podium of the season by finishing second in the first race, while Winterbottom's closest championship rival Craig Lowndes finished third. Jason Bright suffered heavy damage at the first corner of the race, running into the back of David Wall who slowed after Dale Wood spun Todd Kelly. Lowndes improved one position in the second race to finish behind Winterbottom, whose teammate Chaz Mostert finished third. James Moffat was disqualified from both of the Saturday races due to a technical infringement. Mostert took an easy victory in the Sunday race ahead of Lowndes and Winterbottom. Todd Kelly retired due to an engine failure late in the race, prompting an emotional outburst with Kelly exclaiming "why me?" before swearing a number of times.

Sydney Motorsport Park Super Sprint

James Courtney was ruled out of the Sydney Motorsport Park event following Friday practice, where he was hit by a piece of pit equipment which had been flung into the air by a low-flying helicopter. He was replaced by his endurance co-driver, Jack Perkins, for the rest of the event. Chaz Mostert continued his strong qualifying form, taking pole position for both of the Saturday races. He went on to win the first race ahead of his teammate Mark Winterbottom while Jamie Whincup finished third, his first podium finish since the Ubet Perth Super Sprint. Dale Wood was penalised for reckless driving after deliberately running into Nick Percat on the slowdown lap after the race. The pair had come together during the race which resulted in Wood spinning. Whincup won the second race ahead of Fabian Coulthard and Mostert. Mostert took his second win of the weekend in the Sunday race, half of which was held in wet conditions, leading home the two Brad Jones Racing cars of Coulthard and Jason Bright. Bright was spun by Shane van Gisbergen in the closing stages but cut across the grass from turn four to turn eight to retain his position.

Wilson Security Sandown 500

Prodrive Racing Australia scored a one-two finish at the Wilson Security Sandown 500, with Mark Winterbottom and Steve Owen taking victory ahead of teammates Chaz Mostert and Cameron Waters. The Tekno Autosports pairing of Shane van Gisbergen and Jonathon Webb finished in third place. Jamie Whincup and Paul Dumbrell started from pole position and led for the majority of the race, but a puncture, caused by a bracket dislodged by a pit crew member during a pit stop, saw them finish in fifteenth place. Russell Ingall returned to the series to substitute for the injured James Courtney. Ingall partnered Jack Perkins, the pair finishing ninth after starting from twenty-fourth place on the grid. The pairings of Will and Alex Davison and Todd Kelly and Alex Buncombe both finished multiple laps down, the former pair due to a starter motor problem at a pit stop and the latter due to Buncombe running off the track. The only retirement during the race was the car of Nick Percat and Oliver Gavin with steering failure. Winterbottom extended his championship lead over Mostert to 198 points, while David Reynolds, who finished fifth with Dean Canto, moved up to third place in the standings after Craig Lowndes and Steven Richards only managed to finish thirteenth. Winterbottom was fined $3000 for performing a celebratory burnout on the main straight after he finished the race.

Supercheap Auto Bathurst 1000

Chaz Mostert was ruled out for the remainder of the season after sustaining leg and wrist injuries in a major accident during qualifying for the Bathurst 1000. The crash also injured three marshals. The race was won by Craig Lowndes and Steven Richards, who took their sixth and fourth victories respectively, while Mostert's teammates, Mark Winterbottom and Steve Owen finished second. Garth Tander and Warren Luff completed the podium. David Reynolds had qualified on pole position, setting the fastest time in a rain-affected Top Ten Shootout, but he and Dean Canto could only finish sixth. Jamie Whincup and Paul Dumbrell led for most of the race, but Whincup ignored a call to pit during the last safety car period. He then went on to pass the safety car, resulting in a drive-through penalty which dropped the car to eighteenth place. The safety car had been brought on to the track after Scott Pye crashed heavily at the top of the circuit, suffering a fractured rib. With Mostert not taking part in the race, Winterbottom extended his championship lead to 399 points over Lowndes, who moved up to second in the points standings, with Reynolds in third and Mostert falling to fourth place.

Castrol Gold Coast 600

James Courtney returned from injury at the Castrol Gold Coast 600, driving in a race for the first time since the Coates Hire Ipswich Super Sprint. Having replaced Courtney at the previous two events, Russell Ingall moved to Prodrive Racing Australia to replace the injured Chaz Mostert and partner Cameron Waters. Mark Winterbottom had a difficult weekend, allowing Craig Lowndes and David Reynolds to reduce his championship lead. Winterbottom was released into the path of Garth Tander following a pit stop in the Saturday race. This damaged the suspension on Winterbottom's car and the time lost while repairs were made dropped him to 23rd place. His team, Prodrive Racing Australia, also received a 50-point penalty in the Teams' Championship. The race was won by Shane van Gisbergen and Jonathon Webb, who started from pole position and led for most of the race. Reynolds and Dean Canto finished second ahead of Lowndes and Steven Richards. Courtney and Jack Perkins, using an alternative fuel strategy which saw the car pit twice during a mid-race safety car, won the Sunday race ahead of Rick Kelly and David Russell, who used a similar strategy. Garth Tander and Warren Luff, who pitted only once during the safety car period and then pitted for fuel later in the race, finished third. The result saw Tander and Luff win the Pirtek Enduro Cup. With Lowndes finishing fourth and Winterbottom in eleventh, the latter's championship lead was reduced to 258 points.

ITM 500 Auckland

Jamie Whincup dominated the ITM 500 Auckland, winning two of the three races and finishing second in the other. Whincup won from pole position in the first race with Shane van Gisbergen and David Reynolds completing the podium. Scott Pye originally finished in fourth place but was relegated to fifth after cutting a chicane in the closing laps to keep ahead of Craig Lowndes. Lowndes led for the first half of the second race before his left-rear tyre failed at the end of the main straight, causing Lowndes to spin and collide heavily with a wall. The car had to be taken to a local panel shop in order for the necessary repairs to be carried out, with the car not fully fixed until the following morning. Lowndes' demise allowed Reynolds to take victory ahead of Whincup and Scott McLaughlin. Whincup won the third race ahead of Lowndes while Scott Pye achieved his first career podium. Championship leader Mark Winterbottom endured a difficult race, being spun early on before recovering to finish in eleventh place. Reynolds moved into second place in the championship after a strong weekend, 239 points behind Winterbottom and one point ahead of Lowndes.

WD-40 Phillip Island Super Sprint

A number of driver changes took place in the lead-up to the Phillip Island Super Sprint: Chris Pither replaced Andre Heimgartner at Super Black Racing; Dean Canto replaced Ashley Walsh at Erebus Motorsport; and Paul Dumbrell replaced Nick Percat at Lucas Dumbrell Motorsport. Craig Lowndes further reduced Mark Winterbottom's championship lead by winning two races during the weekend. After qualifying third for the first race, Lowndes made a good start to overtake Jamie Whincup and Scott McLaughlin before the first corner, with the three drivers finishing the race in that order. A major talking point of the race was an incident between David Reynolds and Shane van Gisbergen, where van Gisbergen nudged Reynolds into a high-speed spin on the back section of the circuit. Van Gisbergen denied any wrongdoing, claiming that Reynolds cut across him, but was penalised 25 championship points. Whincup won the second race ahead of McLaughlin and Lowndes. Winterbottom qualified on pole for the Sunday race, but it was Lowndes who won the race with McLaughlin and Whincup again finishing on the podium. Winterbottom finished fourth after being pushed wide by Whincup on the final lap, though he described the pass as "a fair move". The result saw Winterbottom's championship lead come down to 179 points over Lowndes, with Reynolds dropping out of championship contention.

Coates Hire Sydney 500

Jamie Whincup continued his strong late-season form by winning the first two races of the Coates Hire Sydney 500. Mark Winterbottom qualified on pole position for the first, with his championship rival Craig Lowndes qualifying last after hitting the wall. Whincup took the lead from Shane van Gisbergen during their pit stops and led to the finish, with van Gisbergen finishing second ahead of Jason Bright. Winterbottom drove a conservative race to finish fifth, while Lowndes made it to fifteenth place. Winterbottom secured the championship by finishing third in the second race behind Whincup and David Reynolds. Van Gisbergen took victory in the third race despite making contact with James Courtney in the opening laps. Courtney spun into the wall and his car suffered damage, but van Gisbergen was not penalised. Whincup finished second ahead of Rick Kelly and Winterbottom. The result saw Winterbottom win the championship by 238 points over Lowndes, with Reynolds in third a further 98 points behind. Van Gisbergen and Whincup, after enjoying a strong weekend, moved up to fourth and fifth in the championship.

Championship standings

Points system
Points were awarded for each race at an event, to the driver/s of a car that completed at least 75% of the race distance and was running at the completion of the race, up to a maximum of 300 points per event.

Short format: Used for the 60 km races of Super Sprint events and the 125 km races of Super Street events.
Long format: Used for the 200 km races of Super Sprint events, the 250 km race of Super Street events and in both races of the Townsville 400 and Gold Coast 600.
Endurance format: Used for the Sandown 500 and Bathurst 1000 endurance races.

Drivers' Championship

Pirtek Endurance Cup

Teams' Championship

Notes:
‡ — Denotes a single-car team.
† — Denotes a wildcard entry.

Manufacturers Championship
The Manufacturers Championship was won by Holden.

See also
2015 V8 Supercar season

References

External links

Supercars Championship seasons
International V8 Supercars